Poli-ye Olya (also Romanized as Polī-ye ‘Olyā; also known as Pūlī-ye Bālā) is a village in Golidagh Rural District, Golidagh District, Maraveh Tappeh County, Golestan Province, Iran. At the 2006 census, its population was 286, in 50 families.

References 

Populated places in Maraveh Tappeh County